Oliver Cromwell was the largest ship in the Connecticut State Navy from her launch on 13 June 1776 until the British Royal Navy captured her in a battle off the coast of Sandy Hook, New Jersey, on 6 June 1779. The Royal Navy renamed her HMS Restoration.

History

Construction
Upon the outbreak of the American Revolutionary War, the Connecticut General Assembly in July 1775 authorized Governor Jonathan Trumbull to purchase and outfit two armed vessels, the largest of which would be Oliver Cromwell. Under the supervision of Capt. Seth Harding, ship builder Uriah Hayden began preliminary work for the project on 30 January. Work began in the Hayden family shipyard that sat on the Connecticut River in Saybrook (Essex), Connecticut, on  April 2, and continued until the ship's launch on 13 June  1776.

Capture of Admiral Keppel
In the spring of 1778 Oliver Cromwell set sail from Boston with Defence for the West Indies, stopping in Charleston, S.C., for refitting.  On April 15th, while sailing east of St. Kitts, the pair encountered two British ships, Admiral Keppel and Cyrus, and captured them. On board Admiral Keppel, and taken prisoner, was Henry Shirley, the former British Ambassador to Russia, and other bureaucrats, and their families, who were en route to Kingston, Jamaica, to relay instructions from London to the colony. Admiral Keppel was sailed to Boston and sold for £22,321, and, after some deliberation by Gov. Trumbull, Mr. Shirley and the other captives were permitted to continue to Kingston under a flag of truce.

End of Service with the Connecticut Navy
A hurricane struck Oliver Cromwell while she was off the coast of the Bahamas in which she was stripped of her masts. In June 1779 she encountered British ships off Sandy Hook and was forced to strike her colors after a battle lasting several hours. After her capture, the British refitted her and commissioned her as HMS Restoration.

References

Ships built in Connecticut
American Revolutionary War ships of the United States
1776 ships